Dumbing of Age is a webcomic about college life at Indiana University by cartoonist David Willis with themes involving drama or comedy, occasionally with a mixture of both. The series itself is a reboot reusing characters from Willis' previous comics (Roomies!, It's Walky!, Joyce and Walky!, and Shortpacked!). While Willis' previous webcomics shared a science-fiction universe, Dumbing of Age is independent of these, reflecting more slice-of-life than the previous works. The comic is generally set in the present day, yet not set in any particular year due to the glacial pacing (Every in-universe day takes around 1-2 months of daily comics), current technologies are depicted in-comic anachronistically so the comic is not a period piece. Willis has reported Dumbing of Age to be his most popular webcomic, with a readership that around three times that of Shortpacked!.

Plot and themes

The story follows a large ensemble cast, most of which are Indiana University first-years living in the same co-ed dorm. Major characters including a Christian girl who was homeschooled, an atheist who is her best friend, a cheerleader who has been disgraced, and many other characters. There are themes of parental abuse, depression, attempted suicide, sexual assault, and some instance of homophobic and transphobic sayings, along with other mature themes.

Characters

Joyce Brown is a homeschooled Christian girl who is outgoing and cheerful, and her best friend is an atheist girl named Dorothy, while a misanthrope, Sarah, is her roommate.

Dorothy Keener is very ambitious and an atheist who is friends with Joyce, somehow. Becky is her roommate, while Sierra was a former roommate and Danny was her former boyfriend. Walky and she also dated for a while.

Amber O'Malley comes from a disruptive home life with an abusive father, growing up with Ethan, her best friend, dating him until he came out as gay at her prom, and Joe is her stepbrother. She later becomes Amazi-Girl, who starts dating Danny at one point, and has been described as "superhero in an otherwise normal setting."

Sal Walkerton is disliked by her parents, with a holdup in a convenience store causing her parents to send her to a boarding school, finding "smoking, tattoos, and motorcycles" there, instead of what her parents expected, leading her to become more rebellious. She is also Malaya's roommate, though the two don't get along.

David “Walky” Walkerton is a favorite child of his parents, is intelligent and gets good grades. He sees the university as a place with no structure, parents, or order. He is also the twin brother of Sal, is the boyfriend of Lucy, and is ignored by Billie. He is also Dorothy's ex-boyfriend.

Becky MacIntyre is the former best friend of Joyce who went to a Christian university at first because her dad thought a secular institution would "corrupt" her mind. She is pulled out by her dad due to having been discovered making out with her roommate, causing an avalanche of events that culminated in the death of her dad and two other people. She would then officially move to Indiana University on a scholarship funded by Robin. Presently she is dating Dina and is Dorothy's roommate.

Jennifer "Billie" Billingsworth was once head of the cheerleader squad at high school and queen of her prom, but now she is an alcoholic. She had an affair with her R.A., Ruth, is the roommate of Lucy, and is in a relationship with Asher.

Ruth Lessick is a resident assistant who rules her floor with an iron fist and sometimes fights with Billie, who she hates. She and Billie dated for a while, and she is now involved somewhat with Jason.

Danny Wilcox is an idealist, romantic, and trusting person, with Joe as his best friend, who is his roommate. On the first day of college, Dorothy, his girlfriend from high school, dumped him, and he hasn't had luck at getting a boyfriend or girlfriend since, though he had a brief relationship with Amazi-Girl.

Sarah Clinton is a misanthrope who likes to study and isn't very social with other people, later ratting out her roommate, Dana, her first year who was using drugs, leading her to become a social pariah.

Dina Saruyama is a small and quiet person who likes to observe rather than talk, though she is comfortable talking about science, especially dinosaurs. She is the roommate of Amber, and the "velociraptor" of Becky.

Ethan Siegal is a gay man who is dashing, understanding, protective, and selfless, coming out to his girlfriend, and best friend, Amber, at his high school prom. He is the roommate of Jacob, may have a crush on Danny, remains friends with Amber. and bonds with Joyce over Transformer cartoons.

Joe Rosenthal is a best friend, and roommate, of Danny, and he went on a failed date with Joyce. Thanks to their parents meeting, he is now also Amber's step-brother, and it's hinted he has a protective crush on Joyce these days.

Carla Rutten, who lives in a single room, wants people to acknowledge her and seemed to style herself after a cartoon character she liked from her childood.  She is also trans and asexual.

Leslie Bean, a gender studies teacher is not good with relationships, and is a mentor to Becky, who was also a homeless lesbian who has issues with her parents.

Jacob Williams is a gorgeous man who is friendly, outgoing, and doesn't like being distracted from his studying. He is the roommate of Ethan, and an object of lust from Sarah.

Robin DeSanto is a former Congressional Representative who lost her reelection by flirting with Leslie. She is currently a professor who wears a bow tie in hopes of attracting Leslie's attention.

Malaya Eugenio is a person who uses any pronouns and realizes they "transcend gender." The gender, if they had to name it, would be "hot." Malaya is Sal's roommate but both do not get along.

Lucy Glenn is a cheerful person with good intentions who was formerly Malaya's roommate but is now Billie's roommate. She has unrequited feelings for Walky and both are close friends.

Roz DeSanto is the little sister of the "fairly conservative Congressional representative" of her district and shouts her progressive beliefs whenever she can, even broadcasting them on YouTube.

Booster Sanchez is the roommate of Walky, has a twin sister, and likes photography. They are currently studying psychology for their major and are new to the college.

Publication

David Willis announced at AnimeFest 2010 that his newest project is titled Dumbing of Age, a return to the setting of the original Roomies! comic, Indiana University, with both old characters from Roomies!, It's Walky!, and Shortpacked! as well as new characters created for Dumbing of Age. Writer and researcher Sean Kleefeld later noted that Willis set the comic in college so he could "work out his personal demons" and to connect with a bigger audience, even though, as Kleefeld puts it, "the characters remained fundamentally the same."

On September 18, 2020, Willis announced that he would be drawing a Patreon-only comic based on the in-universe Dexter and the Monkey Master comics.

Influences
In an interview with The Mary Sue, Willis said that he based Joyce and her family on his own upbringing, with his parents reading the "early 1980s equivalent of Fox News," removing everything that she thought would "corrupt" him, like Scooby-Doo, Disney's Adventures of the Gummi Bears, Care Bears, Mister Rogers' Neighborhood, and The Simpsons, with his family attending a "nondenominational fundamentalist Protestant church." Apart from that, he stated that he passively listened to others, following "wonderful people" on Tumblr, Twitter, and Facebook, hearing what they have to say, and trying to find empathy with others, even if he makes himself "a little uncomfortable" and confronts his white privilege, even revising "false information" at times.

Reception
The comic has been received somewhat positively. Some said that the "sharp changes between humour and seriousness" are a trademark for the comic, while others have called it interesting and enjoyable, even if it is a source of frustration to see "characters in a different setting." Maggie Vicknair of Comics Beat stated while it would not be possible to accurately summarize every plot moment in the comic, each chapter "revolves around one day and jumps between different characters’ adjacent plot lines," with stories range in their subject and tone, even as they are all in the same universe, along with many "interconnected romance plots." Tom Speelman of ComicsAlliance called it one of "the best original ongoing comics being published today," with the characters learning about "life's ups and downs and that adulthood isn't easy," and called it Willis' magnum opus, saying it has "emotionally true storytelling."  He further said that the comic has a "crack sense of humor" and said that anyone coming into college, in college, or in high school should read it, along with those who like his previous works or other webcomics like Questionable Content, Girls With Slingshots or R. K. Milholland's Something Positive.

References 

2010 comics debuts
2010 webcomic debuts
Comics about women
Romance webcomics
Fantasy webcomics
Fictional lesbians
LGBT-related webcomics
Humor comics
Slice of life comics
Transgender-related comics
Universities and colleges in fiction
Comics set in Indiana